Simonson Brook, also known as Sunonson Brook, is a tributary of the Millstone River in southern Franklin Park, Somerset County, New Jersey in the United States.

Course
It has several tributaries draining the area near Route 27. It runs through two housing developments then runs into the woods and flows near Bunker Hill Road, passing through the Bunker Hill Environmental Center and the Griggstown Native Grassland Preserve.

Simonson Brook is smaller than its fellow brooks, the Ten Mile Run and the Six Mile Run. Many of its stream beds are dry in summer.

Accessibility
Simonson Brook can be accessed by trails in the Griggstown Native Grassland Preserve, part of the Ten Mile Run Greenway. It also crosses several roads, such as Barbieri Court and Ridings Parkway. It is easily accessible at Canal Road.

Animal life
Simonson Brook has several slow spots which are home to frogs. It is characterized by deep pools in some tributaries which hold many fish.

Terrain
This stream is very rocky near its mouth, with broken slate covering the streambed. Occasional deep pools exist on the streambed. It is fed by periodic springs, making it dry up very easily when it is not raining. Fish have a difficult time living in the stream because it dries up often.

Sister tributaries
Beden Brook
Bear Brook
Cranbury Brook
Devils Brook
Harrys Brook
Heathcote Brook
Indian Run Brook
Little Bear Brook
Millstone Brook
Peace Brook
Rocky Brook
Royce Brook
Six Mile Run
Stony Brook
Ten Mile Run
Van Horn Brook

Gallery

See also
List of rivers of New Jersey

References

External links
USGS Coordinates in Google Maps

Tributaries of the Raritan River
Rivers of New Jersey
Rivers of Somerset County, New Jersey